Vahid Hashemian Korbekandi (born 21 July 1976) is an Iranian football coach and former player who works as assistant coach to Dragan Skočić at Iran national team. He played as a forward, spending most of his career in Germany. He made 50 appearances for the Iran national team scoring 15 goals.

Club career
Hashemian started his professional football career with Pas Tehran in his homeland. He arrived in Germany for the 1999–2000 season to play for Hamburger SV. Playing alongside his fellow Iranian international Mehdi Mahdavikia, he had just 12 appearances, so he left the club for VfL Bochum to show his real ability. He had three good seasons with Bochum, scoring 34 goals in 87 appearances. During his last season there he scored 16 goals, helping Bochum to finish fifth in the Bundesliga and qualify for the 2004–05 UEFA Cup. This prompted Bayern Munich to grant him in a €2 million contract, hence giving him the chance to follow in the footsteps of Ali Daei. After one season with Bayern Munich, he joined Hannover 96 at the start of the 2005–06 season. On 23 April 2008, VfL Bochum officials announced that he would return to their club in the season 2008–09. Hashemian signed a two-year contract with an option for one extra year. He scored only one goal for the team and was benched most of the times in his first season. On 30 December 2010, Hashemian signed a deal with Iran Pro League side Persepolis. Where he was able to win the Hazfi Cup. On 19 July 2011, he extended his contract with the Iranian club Persepolis for another year. On 20 May 2012, it was announced that he will be leaving the club at the end of the season. On 21 July 2012, on his 36th birthday, he announced his retirement from football.

International career
Hashemian debuted for the Iran national team on 1 December 1998 in a friendly match against Kazakhstan. After the 2000 Asian Cup he refused to play for Team Melli but after four years finally decided to come and help his country to qualify for the World Cup. Hashemian was a key player for Iran national team in recent years and scored vital goals for the national team, such as netting an important goal in a World Cup qualification game against Qatar in October 2004, as well as scoring two magnificent goals in a win over Japan in Tehran in March 2005. He played all three of Iran's games in the 2006 World Cup.

He started in the line-up in all the games at 2007 Asian Cup, under Amir Ghalenoi, butdeclined to play for the Iran national team in the first round of 2010 FIFA World Cup Qualifying. Hashemian was later invited for the second round of World Cup Qualifying playing in Iran's 1–1 tie versus Saudi Arabia. He announced that he would retire from the national team and he wished to coach Team Melli when he retires from football.

Coaching career
Hashemian gained his UEFA B Licence in 2008 while playing in Bundesliga, before completing his A Licence in 2012. Hashemian was named as one of the 24 coaches handpicked by the DFB to take part in its 10-month course, Fußballlehrer, in 2014. He also took a three-weeks internship under Pep Guardiola at Bayern Munich, as part of the program, and obtained the german certificate equivalent to UEFA Pro Licence.

Oberliga Hamburg (2012–13)
Hashemian then started his coaching career in Oberliga Hamburg, where he worked for the next 14 months. Accepting a job offer by Thomas Bliemeister, then-coach of SV Halstenbek-Rellingen who took position as the club's technical director, he was appointed as the coach on 26 October 2012. In July 2013 he signed with Niendorfer TSV, but left the team in the mid-season in order to pursue his professional training.

Hamburger SV (2017–18)
In early 2017, Hashemian signed a contract with Hamburger SV and was assigned as an individual trainer at the club's youth academy for six months. During the 2017–18 season, he was assistant to the club's U17 coach, Pit Reimers. Replacing Steffen Weiß, the club officially appointed him as the coach of its reserve team in April 2018, because his Fußballlehrer license prevented a lawsuit against the club by demoted players Walace and Mërgim Mavraj, while the former coach did not have any. A few days later, Achim Feifel took over the team and Hashemian was returned to his old job. By the end of season, Weiß remained to coach the reserve team again for the next season and Hashemian rejected an offer to extend his contract as a youth academy trainer He left HSV in May 2018, when the contract expired.

Outside football

Personal life
In July 2012, his wife Bita gave birth to a daughter named Elena.

Business activities
Hashemian has registered a trademark named "German Sports", in order to produce and sell sports equipment under his own name. He has founded German Home LTP GmbH, a company in Germany that specializes in exporting home appliances to Iran.

Career statistics

Club

International

Scores and results list Iran's goal tally first, score column indicates score after each Hashemian goal.

Managerial statistics

Honours
Bayern Munich
 Bundesliga: 2004–05
 DFB-Pokal: 2004–05
 DFB-Ligapokal: 2004

Persepolis
 Hazfi Cup: 2010–11

Iran
 Asian Games Gold Medal: 1998
 WAFF Championship: 2000

References

Iranian footballers
Iran international footballers
Association football forwards
Pas players
Bundesliga players
2. Bundesliga players
Hamburger SV players
VfL Bochum players
FC Bayern Munich footballers
Hannover 96 players
Expatriate footballers in Germany
Iranian expatriate footballers
Iranian expatriate sportspeople in Germany
2000 AFC Asian Cup players
2006 FIFA World Cup players
2007 AFC Asian Cup players
1976 births
Living people
People from Tehran
Asian Games gold medalists for Iran
Asian Games medalists in football
Footballers at the 1998 Asian Games
Medalists at the 1998 Asian Games
Iranian businesspeople
Hamburger SV non-playing staff
Persepolis F.C. players